Tien Chiu-chin (born 27 May 1954) is a Taiwanese politician. She served in the Legislative Yuan from 2005 to 2016, and later that year became the deputy minister of the Overseas Community Affairs Council. Tien was nominated a member of the Control Yuan in 2018.

Early life
Tien obtained her master's degree in philosophy from National Taiwan University.

Political career
Tien won three straight elections on the Democratic Progressive Party party-list proportional representation ticket in 2004, 2008, and 2012. She was named deputy minister of the Overseas Community Affairs Council in 2016, and nominated by the Tsai Ing-wen presidential administration to the Control Yuan in March 2017. During her legislative confirmation hearing in January 2018, she expressed conditional agreement to the abolition of the Control Yuan. Tien's nomination, alongside ten others, was approved by the Legislative Yuan, as the Democratic Progressive Party held a majority. Tien was renominated to the Control Yuan in June 2020.

References

Democratic Progressive Party Members of the Legislative Yuan
Living people
1954 births
Members of the 6th Legislative Yuan
Members of the 7th Legislative Yuan
Members of the 8th Legislative Yuan
Party List Members of the Legislative Yuan
National Taiwan University alumni
Taiwanese Members of the Control Yuan
Women government ministers of Taiwan
Government ministers of Taiwan